Van Nuys/San Fernando is a planned light rail station on the Los Angeles County Metro Rail system. The station is part of the East San Fernando Light Rail Project. It is located near the corners of Van Nuys Boulevard and El Dorado Way, near San Fernando Road in Pacoima. The station is expected to open in 2028 as the interim northern terminus of the line until service is extended to Sylmar/San Fernando station.

References

Future Los Angeles Metro Rail stations
Railway stations scheduled to open in 2028
Pacoima, Los Angeles